Khlebodarovka is a rural locality (a selo) in Alexandrovsky Selsoviet, Meleuzovsky District, Bashkortostan, Russia. The population was 253 as of 2010. There are 2 streets.

Geography 
Khlebodarovka is located 36 km northeast of Meleuz (the district's administrative centre) by road. Andreyevsky is the nearest rural locality.

References 

Rural localities in Meleuzovsky District